Douglas McCombs is an American musician who plays bass and guitar with the instrumental rock band Tortoise and leads the instrumental band Brokeback. He is also the longtime bassist for the rock band Eleventh Dream Day. In 1997, he formed Pullman with Bundy K. Brown, Chris Brokaw, and Curtis Harvey, with whom he released two albums. In May 2018, McCombs replaced Eric Claridge as the touring bassist with Chicago jazz-pop outfit The Sea and Cake.

Brokeback
Brokeback is a project of McCombs. It has featured the following artists:

 Rob Mazurek
 Noel Kupersmith
 Mary Hansen (Stereolab)
 James McNew (Yo La Tengo)
 Chad Taylor (Chicago Underground Duo)
 Tim Foljahn (Two Dollar Guitar)
 James Elkington (The Zincs, Tweedy, The Horse's Ha)
 R. Christopher Hansen (Pinebender)
 Areif Sless-Kitain
 Pete Croke

Discography 
Another Routine Day Breaks, 7-inch EP, Hi-Ball Records - 1997
Returns to the Orange Grove, Thrill Jockey - 1997
Field Recordings from Cook County Water Table, Thrill Jockey - 1999 
Morse Code In The Modern Age: Across The Americas, Thrill Jockey - 2001
Looks at the Bird, Thrill Jockey - 2003
Brokeback and the Black Rock, Thrill Jockey - 2013
Illinois River Valley Blues, Thrill Jockey - 2017

References

Living people
American rock guitarists
American male bass guitarists
Musicians from Peoria, Illinois
Guitarists from Illinois
20th-century American bass guitarists
Boxhead Ensemble members
Tortoise (band) members
The For Carnation members
20th-century American male musicians
Year of birth missing (living people)